Candy Dulfer (born 19 September 1969) is a Dutch jazz and pop saxophonist. She is the daughter of jazz saxophonist Hans Dulfer. She began playing at age six and founded her band Funky Stuff when she was fourteen. Her debut album Saxuality (1990) received a Grammy nomination. She has performed and recorded with Hans Dulfer, Prince, Dave Stewart, Van Morrison, Angie Stone, Maceo Parker and Rick Braun and has performed live with Alan Parsons (1995), Pink Floyd (1990), and Tower of Power (2014). She hosted the Dutch television series Candy Meets... (2007), in which she interviewed musicians. In 2013, she became a judge in the 5th season of the Dutch version of X Factor.

Early life

Dulfer was born on 19 September 1969 in Amsterdam, Netherlands. She began playing the drums at the age of five. As a six-year-old, she started to play the soprano saxophone. At age seven, she switched to alto saxophone and later began playing in a local concert band Jeugd Doet Leven (English translation: "Youth Brings Life") in Zuiderwoude.

Dulfer played her first solo on stage with her father's band De Perikels ("The Perils"). At age eleven, she made her first recordings for the album I Didn't Ask (1981) of De Perikels. In 1982, when she was twelve years old, she played as a member of Rosa King's Ladies Horn section at the North Sea Jazz Festival. According to Dulfer, King encouraged her to become a band leader. In 1984, at age fourteen, she started the band Funky Stuff.

Career
Dulfer's band performed throughout the Netherlands and in 1987 was the opening act for two of Madonna's European concerts.

In 1988, Prince invited Dulfer on stage to play an improvised solo during one of his European shows. In 1989 Dulfer appeared in Prince's "Partyman" video.

Dulfer performed session work with Eurythmics guitarist and producer Dave Stewart, duetting with him on the worldwide hit single "Lily Was Here" and contributing to the soundtrack of the same name. She was a guest musician for Pink Floyd during the band's performance at Knebworth in 1990, from which several tracks were released on a multi-artist live album and video, Live at Knebworth '90. The Knebworth show has since been released as part of the Pink Floyd box set The Later Years 1987–2019 on CD, DVD, and BD.

Dulfer was also the featured saxophonist on Van Morrison's A Night in San Francisco, an album in 1993, and performed with Alan Parsons and his band at the World Liberty Concert in 1995.

Dulfer collaborated with her father Hans Dulfer on the duet album Dulfer Dulfer in 2001. She joined Prince's band in 2004 for his Musicology Live 2004ever tour.

In 2007, she released her ninth studio album Candy Store. The album reached a No. 2 position in Billboard's Top Contemporary Jazz charts. Her songs "Candy Store" and "L.A. Citylights" reached the No. 1 position in Smooth Jazz National Airplay charts in the United States.

Dulfer is mostly a self-taught musician except for some training in a concert band and a few months of music lessons.
Until 2010 Dulfer played a Selmer Mk VI alto - which is visible in the majority of early photographs. In 2010 she became an endorsee of the Dutch Free Wind saxophone, created by Friso Heidinga, who started building saxophones in Amsterdam in 2009.

In 2007, Dulfer became the presenter and interviewer in Candy Meets..., her television program for the Dutch public broadcaster NPS. In the series, she met with Sheila E., Maceo Parker, Hans Dulfer, Van Morrison, Dave Stewart, and Mavis Staples.

On 26 August 2022, Dulfer announced her new album We Never Stop, which released on October 28th. The release is the first as a part of her new record deal with Mascot Label Group. The album was preceded by the single "Jammin' Tonight," featuring Nile Rodgers.

Discography

 Saxuality (1990)
 Sax-a-Go-Go (1993)
 Big Girl (1995)
 For the Love of You (1997)
 Girls Night Out (1999)
 What Does It Take (1999)
 Dulfer Dulfer (2002)
 Right in My Soul (2003)
 Candy Store (2007)
 Funked Up (2009)
 Crazy (2011)
 Together (2017)
 We Never Stop (2022)

References

External links

Candy Dulfer Channel on YouTube

1969 births
Living people
21st-century saxophonists
Dutch women singers
Dutch jazz saxophonists
English-language singers from the Netherlands
Women jazz saxophonists
Funk saxophonists
Heads Up International artists
Jazz alto saxophonists
Musicians from Amsterdam
Smooth jazz saxophonists
New Power Generation members
Bertelsmann Music Group artists